, also known as The Legend of Zipang is a 1990 Japanese tokusatsu fantasy film directed by Kaizo Hayashi. The film stars Masahiro Takashima as Jigoku Gokuraku Maru.

Cast
 Masahiro Takashima as Jigoku Gokuraku Maru
 Narumi Yasuda as Yuri the Pistol
 Shirō Sano as Bunshichi the Puppetmaster
 Kenya Sawada as Tobatsu
 Mikio Narita as Hayashi Razan
 Mikijirō Hira as King of Zipang
 Haruko Wanibuchi as Queen
 Takuya Wada as Ashura
 Jian Xin as Tattoo Man

Release

Theatrical
Zipang was released in Japan on January 27, 1990 where it was distributed by Toho. The film was released at the Stockholm International Film Festival in November 1990 in Sweden.

Home media
Video TBS released the film on VHS in 1990 and Art Port released the film on DVD in 2001.

Remarks
In scenes that transcend time and space, a time-consuming expression method is adopted in which photographs are copied and modified, and effects such as zooming and rotation are added to take each photograph one-by-one.

Reception
The Austin Chronicle said, "if, however, you're looking to switch off your brain and simply have a good time, then don't miss out on this kinetic roller coaster of a movie... it's a real hoot."

Other media
The video game Jigoku Gokuraku Maru (地獄極楽丸) for the Famicom is a tie-in for this movie. It was retitled Kabuki: Quantum Fighter for its Western release, and the plot was changed to remove the connection to the movie.

References

External links
 
 

1990 films
1990s science fiction films
Japanese fantasy films
Japanese science fiction films
Toho tokusatsu films
1990s Japanese films